Sergei Vladimirovich Kvasov (born 11 June 1983) is a former Russian professional football player.

Club career
He played 4 seasons in the Russian Football National League for FC Nizhny Novgorod and FC Khimik Dzerzhinsk.

References

External links
 

1983 births
Living people
Russian footballers
Association football midfielders
FC Nizhny Novgorod (2007) players
FC Khimik Dzerzhinsk players